Al-Ḥadīd is the 57th chapter (sūrah) of the Quran with 29 verses. The chapter takes its name from that word which appears in the 25th verse. This is an Al-Musabbihat surah because it begins with the glorification of Allah.

Summary
1-6 God ( Allah ) is omniscient and most powerful. 
7-11 Muslims exhorted to give alms and help the Prophet's mission
12-14 The wise and the foolish in the judgment-day
15-17 True believers admonished to submit humbly to God
18 God will reward the faithful but will punish the wicked
19-20 The present life a vain show
21 Men exhorted to seek the life to come
22-23 All things recorded in God's book of decrees
24 God hateth proud and covetous persons (therefore the defeat at Ohod)
25 Apostles sent to former nations
26-27 Noah, Abraham, the prophets, and Jesus, with the Gospel, sent
28-29 Christians exhorted to become Muslims

Exegesis
In his tafsir (exegesis), Ma’ariful-Qur’an, Muhammad Shafi Deobandi wrote: “It is recorded in Abu Dawud, Tirmidhi and Nasa’i that Sayyidna ‘Irbad Ibn Sariyah (may Allah be pleased with him) said that the Messenger of Allah (may peace be upon him) used to recite Al-Musabbihat before he went to sleep and said: ‘In them there is a verse that is more meritorious than a thousand verses’.

“The collective name of the series Al-Musabbihat refers to the following five Surahs: (1) Al-Hadid; (2) Al-Hashr; (3) As-Saff; (4) Al-Jumu’ah; and (5) At-Taghabun.

“Having cited this Hadith, Ibn Kathir says that the best verse referred to in Surah Al-Hadid is verse (3). (He is the First and the Last, and the Manifest and the Hidden, and He is All-knowing about everything . . . 57:3).

“Among the five Surahs, the first three namely Al-Hadid, Al-Hashr and As-Saff commence with the past perfect tense ‘sabbaha’ (purity has been proclaimed) whilst the last two, namely Al-Jumu’ah and At-Taghabun commence with the imperfect tense ‘yusabbihu’ (purity is proclaimed). This implies that the purity of Allah should be declared at all times, the past, the present and the future. [Mazhari]”

In Kitab al-Kafi, Imam Musa al-Kadhim was asked for the interpretation of 57:11 Who is it that would loan Allah a goodly loan so He will multiply it for him and he will have a noble reward?, to which he replied "this was revealed about payment to the Imams. One dirham paid to the Imam is greater in weight than the mountain of Uhud and the reward is greater than two million dirhams paid for other charities." Another narration states it is the "good" towards the Imam during a government of mischief.

References

External links

Hadid